State Highway 100 (abbreviated SH-100 or OK-100) is a  long (88.4 km) state highway in eastern Oklahoma. It connects Interstate 40 with the Arkansas state line near Stilwell. It has no lettered spur routes.

Route description
SH-100 begins at I-40 Exit 287. It heads north to meet US-64 in Webbers Falls, and overlaps it until Gore. In the Gore area, it has a brief overlap with State Highway 10 as well. After Gore, it splits off on its own and heads roughly northeast. It meets State Highway 10A near Lake Tenkiller, where it turns due east. Near Box, it meets State Highway 82, where it turns north and overlaps.

It then crosses the state line into Arkansas, becoming Arkansas Highway 156.

History
SH-100 was first added to the highway system on June 7, 1954. Originally, the highway began south of the Standing Rock Bridge and headed north to end at the city limits of Stilwell. It was twice extended in 1956; on June 4 of that year, the route's eastern terminus was brought to the Arkansas state line. However, SH-100 and SH-51 shared a wrong-way concurrency through Stilwell, and SH-100 used the present-day routing of SH-51 east of that town. On November 19, 1956, the route's western terminus was moved to SH-10 near Gore.

By 1970, Interstate 40 had been built through Muskogee County, and on June 1, 1970, SH-100 was extended along US-64 to its present-day western terminus. The final major change in the highway's routing was on August 9, 1971, when it was switched with SH-51 east of Stilwell, establishing its current eastern terminus. Since then, only minor relocations have taken place.

The section of SH-100 west of Gore was pressed into service as a detour for I-40 traffic after the collapse of its bridge over the Arkansas River on May 26, 2002. The detour significantly impacted the town of Gore. Local firefighters directed traffic there 24 hours a day, with daytime temperatures approaching . Businesses in Gore reported loss of revenue due to the traffic; one gas station reported a 30% decline in revenue while traffic was detoured through town. Delays of thirty to fifty minutes on the  detour were typical, although trains passing through Gore could lengthen wait times by 15 minutes.

Junction list

References

External links
SH-100 at Roadklahoma

100
Transportation in Muskogee County, Oklahoma
Transportation in Sequoyah County, Oklahoma
Transportation in Cherokee County, Oklahoma
Transportation in Adair County, Oklahoma